Unprecedented is a 2020 UK television series first shown on BBC Four.

It comprised 14 short plays, first broadcast in five episodes from 26 May to 29 May 2020. Each play was performed and recorded remotely, during the lockdown caused by the COVID-19 pandemic, and concerned different aspects of life under lockdown. Actors taking part included Geraldine James, Lennie James and Alison Steadman.

Plays

References

External links

BBC television dramas
2020s British drama television series
2020 British television series debuts
2020 British television series endings
Television shows about the COVID-19 pandemic